Atlantis is a media franchise owned by The Walt Disney Company. The franchise began in 2001 with the release of the film Atlantis: The Lost Empire.

Films

Atlantis: The Lost Empire
Atlantis: The Lost Empire is a 2001 film produced by Walt Disney Animation Studios—the first science fiction film in Disney's animated features canon and the 41st overall.

Atlantis: Milo's Return
Atlantis: Milo's Return is a 2003 film. It is Disney's twentieth animated direct-to-video sequel and is a sequel to Atlantis: The Lost Empire.

Cancelled projects

Atlantis II
Originally, Disney was developing a theatrical sequel, but it was abandoned once The Lost Empire was less successful than anticipated. Gary Trousdale and Kirk Wise were set to return as directors, along with Don Hahn as producer and John Sanford as story supervisor. According to Wise, the sequel would have seen most of the original characters return. The main villain was to be a cybernetic version of Helga Sinclair, who survived the balloon crash at the end of the first film, and established her own mercenary group to raid Atlantis.

Team Atlantis
The film was also meant to inspire an animated television series entitled Team Atlantis, which would have presented the further adventures of its characters. The series would feature episodes with different legends incorporated, such as Puck, the Loch Ness Monster, and the Terracotta Warriors. One of the episodes of Team Atlantis that was never animated entitled "The Last" featured an appearance by Demona from Greg Wiseman's previous Disney series Gargoyles and served as a pseudo-crossover between them. However, because of the film's under-performance at the box office the series was not produced either.

On 2003, Disney ended up releasing a direct-to-video sequel film to The Lost Empire titled Atlantis: Milo's Return, consisting of three episodes planned for the aborted series, with some additional animation done to link the stories more closely.

Video games

Atlantis: The Lost Empire – Search for the Journal
Atlantis: The Lost Empire – Search for the Journal is a first-person shooter game developed by Zombie Studios and published by Disney Interactive. It was released on May 1, 2001, for Microsoft Windows.

Atlantis: The Lost Empire – Trial by Fire
Atlantis: The Lost Empire – Trial by Fire is a first-person shooter game developed by Zombie Studios and published by Disney Interactive. It was released on May 18, 2001, for Microsoft Windows.

Atlantis: The Lost Empire
Atlantis: The Lost Empire is an action-adventure game developed by Eurocom Entertainment Software and published by Sony Computer Entertainment for the PlayStation, and a platform game developed by Eurocom Entertainment Software for the Game Boy Color and 3d6 Games for the Game Boy Advance, and published by THQ on both consoles. The PlayStation version was released in June 12, 2001, the Game Boy Color version was released on June 14, 2001, and the Game Boy Advance version was released on September 28, 2001.<ref>{{Cite web |date=May 4, 2012 |first=Jayson|last=Dubin |url=https://www.gamezone.com/news/thq_ships_quot_disney_s_atlantis_the_lost_empire_for_gba/|title=THQ Ships "Disney's Atlantis: The Lost Empire for GBA |website=GameZone |access-date=Jan 23, 2023}}</ref>

Disney Heroes: Battle Mode

Milo, Audrey, Helga, Kida, and Vinny appear as playable characters in the role-playing mobile game Disney Heroes: Battle Mode.

Proposed attractions
 Atlantis Submarine Voyage - After Disneyland closed its Submarine Voyage ride in 1998, there had reportedly been intentions to reopen the attraction with a new theme by 2003. Rumors circulated that Disney was planning to renovate the ride to have an Atlantis: The Lost Empire theme. Fan speculation may have been fueled by a banner which very briefly hung nearby the closed-down ride, reading "Atlantis Expedition Imagineering Preparation Base". Any existing plans for an Atlantis: The Lost Empire themed remodel were canceled quickly after the movie's disappointing release at the box office in 2001. The attraction was re-opened in 2007 as the Finding Nemo Submarine Voyage, its theme based on the extremely successful 2003 Pixar film Finding Nemo.
 Fire Mountain - After the Submarine Voyage's Magic Kingdom counterpart, 20,000 Leagues Under the Sea: Submarine Voyage, closed down in 1994, four years before Disneyland's, there were proposals of a new attraction that would take its place, with one of them a volcano attraction inspired by that film's Vulcania location, being approved for the Magic Kingdom's Adventureland area. Around 1999, during development of Atlantis: The Lost Empire, it was decided that it would be themed to the movie, with it taking place in 1916, two years after the film's events. The ride would have focused on Preston Whitmore, a character from the film, seeking to make Atlantis existence public and offer expeditions to visitors in newly developed vehicles. However, due to mishaps, the vehicles would be forced to make a detour through the lava-filled caverns of the volcano. The attraction would have used a unique hybrid ride system, in which it would start as a standard coaster before the trains hook up to a suspended track midway through to fly through the caverns. The attraction would have been accessed by a new canyon path in between Pirates of the Caribbean and a re-routed Jungle Cruise that would have led to a Whitmore Enterprises base camp at the edge of the Walt Disney World Railroad path, with the mountain itself being built outside the berm. However, like the previous Submarine Voyage retheme, the ride was cancelled due to the film's disappointment in the box office.

Music
The soundtrack to Atlantis: The Lost Empire was released on May 22, 2001. It consists primarily of James Newton Howard's score and includes "Where the Dream Takes You", written by Howard and Diane Warren and performed by Mýa. It was also available in a limited edition of 20,000 numbered copies with a unique 3D album cover insert depicting the Leviathan from the film. A rare promotional edition (featuring 73 minutes of material, compared to the 53 minutes on standard commercial editions) was intended only for Academy of Motion Picture Arts and Sciences voters, but was bootlegged and distributed with fan-created artwork.

Atlantean language
The Atlantean language is a constructed language created by Marc Okrand for Disney's film Atlantis: The Lost Empire''. The language was intended by the script-writers to be a possible "mother language", and Okrand crafted it to include a vast Indo-European word stock with its very own grammar, which is at times described as highly agglutinative, inspired by Sumerian and North American languages.

To create this, Dr. Okrand took common characteristics of all world languages and applied them to the Proto-Indo-European language. His main source of words (roots and stems) for the language is Proto-Indo-European, but Okrand also uses ancient Chinese, Biblical Hebrew, Latin and Greek languages, along with a variety of other ancient languages or ancient language reconstruction.

References

Film series introduced in 2001
Atlantis: The Lost Empire
Walt Disney Studios (division) franchises